William Mellish (c.1710 – 16 December 1791) was a British government administrator and Member of Parliament.

He was born the second son of Joseph Mellish of Doncaster, Yorkshire and Blyth Hall, Nottinghamshire and was educated at Eton School (1725) and Peterhouse, Cambridge (1726). He studied law in Lincoln's Inn (1725) and the Inner Temple (1734). He succeeded to Blyth in 1757 on the death of his elder brother Edward. His younger brother Joseph was MP for Great Grimsby.

He was employed as the Lord Treasurer’s remembrancer in the Exchequer from 1733 to 1754. He was appointed a  Commissioner of Excise for 1751-1760 and Receiver General of Customs from 1760 to January 1763 and from  1765 to 1786. He served as Joint Secretary to the Treasury in July 1765.

Mellish was elected the Member of Parliament for East Retford from 1741 to 18 December 1751.

He died in 1791. He had married twice, firstly Kitty da Costa, the daughter of Joseph da Costa, with whom he had 2 sons and secondly Anne, the daughter of John Gore of Bush Hill, Middlesex, with whom he had 5 sons and a daughter. His son Charles by his first wife became MP for Pontefract and then Aldborough. His third son William (by his second wife) was MP for Great Grimsby.

References 

1710s births
1791 deaths
People educated at Eton College
Alumni of Peterhouse, Cambridge
Members of Lincoln's Inn
Members of the Inner Temple
Retford
William
Da Costa family
Members of the Parliament of Great Britain for English constituencies
British MPs 1741–1747
British MPs 1747–1754